The Jouffret was a French automobile manufactured between 1920 and 1926.  Built by Léon Demeester, first in Suresnes and then in Colombes they were sometimes marketed under his own name.  They used 1172 cc and 1616 cc ohv engines from S.C.A.P. and Ruby.  In 1923, the company took over Sidéa, and began production of Sidéa-Jouffret cars.

References
David Burgess Wise, The New Illustrated Encyclopedia of Automobiles

Defunct motor vehicle manufacturers of France